Kelham Bridge is a   nature reserve north of Ibstock in Leicestershire. It is owned and managed by the Leicestershire and Rutland Wildlife Trust.

The conversion of this former sewage disposal site to a nature reserve was completed in 2002. The River Sence has been diverted to create meanders, extending flooded areas and reedbeds; 101 bird, 19 butterfly and 16 dragonfly species have been recorded.

There is access from the A447 road.

References

Leicestershire and Rutland Wildlife Trust